Adam D. Tihany (born Transylvania in 1948) is a hospitality designer based in New York. He founded multidisciplinary design firm Tihany Design in 1978, and is considered the originator of the title "restaurant designer". His firm has designed hotel and dining properties at many notable properties around the world. Tihany was named one of the greatest American interior architects by The New York Times in 2001.

Early life and education
Born in Transylvania, Adam D. Tihany spent his childhood in Jerusalem and later studied architecture at the Politecnico di Milano in Italy. He took his first opportunity to move to America, and in 1978, he established his own multidisciplinary New York design firm. In 1981 he designed La Coupole in New York City. Restaurant design allowed him the opportunity to design everything from the interiors and furniture to the Bernardaud table top and uniforms. He is often credited as being the first self-labeled "restaurant designer". His early years working in the foodservice industry prompted him to become co-owner of Remi restaurants in 1987, together with partner and executive chef Francesco Antonucci.

Career

Restaurant design
Tihany has built his career around the art of hospitality. In the restaurant industry, he collaborated with acclaimed culinary stars such as Thomas Keller, Daniel Boulud, Jean-Georges Vongerichten, Charlie Palmer, Heston Blumenthal, Paul Bocuse, and Pierre Gagnaire. Tihany has created several restaurants for Chef Thomas Keller, including the Per Se and Bouchon restaurants, as well as recently opened The Grill on Seabourn Quest. He worked extensively with the Maccioni family, collaborating on eight projects including Le Cirque 2000, Osteria del Circo and the contemporary Italian restaurant, Sirio. Chef Daniel Boulud and the designer have created three restaurants together, including Boulud’s flagship, Daniel, in New York City.

In 2004, Tihany designed the decor for a pool-side restaurant in San José del Cabo, Mexico. His lantern-design was then available for purchase.

Hotels
Tihany’s hotel work can be found in some of the most iconic properties in the world, including One & Only Cape Town resort in South Africa, Waldorf Astoria Las Vegas, Westin Chosun in Seoul, The Joule in Dallas, The King David Hotel in Jerusalem, The Beverly Hills Hotel, The Breakers in Palm Beach, The Broadmoor in Colorado Springs, and the Four Seasons Dubai DIFC.

Tihany is bringing is design concepts to the next generation of Holland America and Seabourn vessels, slated for delivery between 2016-2018. He served as Creative Director for the new Costa Cruises, overseeing a team of acclaimed design firms in the development of Italy’s finest.

Product design
Tihany has licensed product lines for several companies: Pace Collection and McGuire; Villeroy & Boch and Schönwald china, hardware for Valli & Valli; lighting for Lucifer and Baldinger and linens for Frette. His longstanding association with Christofle has resulted in Collection 3000, Urban flatware, and K + T Hollowware designed with Thomas Keller. He recently collaborated with Poltrona Frau in the creation of The Stanley Chair, which debuted in the company’s new home theater collection in spring of 2016.

In 1998, Tihany designed a martini glass as a prop for an advertisement which he later began selling, on a limited-basis, for $550 apiece.

Honors and awards
Tihany's contribution to design has been recognized with honors and awards including an Honorary Doctorate from the New York School of Interior Design and induction into the Interior Design Hall of Fame in 1991. Tihany was recognized by Who’s Who in Food and Beverage in the United States by The James Beard Foundation in 1997, named Bon Appetit's Designer of the Year in 2001, and awarded the prestigious Lawrence Israel Prize from the Fashion Institute of Technology in 2005. He was appointed Art Director of The Culinary Institute of America in 2011 and currently sits on Pratt Institute’s Board of Trustees.

Books
 Tihany Design, Monacelli Press, 1997
 Tihany Style, Mondadori Electa, 2004
 Tihany: Iconic Hotel and Restaurant Interiors, Rizzoli, 2014

Notable projects
Hotels
 Aleph Rome, 2003
 Casa MANNI Roma
 Four Seasons Dubai International Financial Centre
 Four Seasons Resort Dubai at Jumeirah Beach 
 The Joule Hotel Dallas
 Mandarin Oriental Geneva
 Mandarin Oriental Las Vegas
 Landmark Mandarin Oriental, Hong Kong
 One&Only Cape Town
 The Beverly Hills Hotel
 The Westin Chosun Seoul
 King David Hotel, Jerusalem
 The Breakers, Palm Beach
 The Belmond Grand Hotel Europe, St. Petersburg
 The Time New York
Restaurants
 Amber, Landmark Mandarin Oriental, Hong Kong
 Apsleys London, 2008
 At.Mosphere, Burj Khailfa, Dubai
 Aureole Las Vegas
 Aureole New York City
 Bar Boulud London
 Bar Boulud Boston
 Bocuse at The Culinary Institute of America
 Bouchon Beverly Hills
 Daniel New York
 Dinner London
 Flagler Steakhouse at The Breakers
 HMF at The Breakers
 Huberts
 Metro
 Oro Restaurant, Belmond Cipriani Hotel, Venice 
 Per Se New York
 Saffron Dubai
 Sirio
 Sirio at The Pierre New York
 The Line Singapore
 Veranda
 The Grill by Thomas Keller, Seabourn Quest 
Cruise Ships
 Ms Koningsdam, Holland America Line, 2016
 Celebrity Solstice, RCCL, 2011
 Encore, Seabourn, 2016
Exhibits
 Dining Design Milan, 2004 
 GrandHotelSalone Milan, 2002
 Abitare Il Tempo Venice, 2001
 Borsa Internazionale del Turismo BIT, 2003

References

External links
 Official website

1948 births
Living people
American architects
American interior designers
Culinary Institute of America people
Polytechnic University of Milan alumni